Christian Ludwig Nitzsch (3 September 1782 – 16 August 1837) was a German zoologist. He is best remembered for his approach to classifying birds on the basis of their feather tract distributions or pterylosis of their young.

Career
He was professor of zoology at the University of Halle. While his primary interest lay in ornithology, Nitzsch published studies on other topics, including diatoms (the diatom genus Nitzchia is named after him). He is also widely credited with producing the first systematic zoological studies of lice, Nitzsch Ch. L., Darstellung der Familien und Gattungen der Thierinsecten (insecta epizoica). Magazin fur die Entomologie, Germar, Zincken, Bd.3 (1818). In 1832, he was elected a foreign member of the Royal Swedish Academy of Sciences.

Works 
 De respiratione animalium, 1808
 „Die Familien der Thierinsekten“ im Germar's Magazin für Entomologie, Band 3 1818
 „Zur Geschichte der Thierinsektenkunde“ in der Zeitschrift für gesammelte Naturwissenschaften 5 Band 1855
 „Charakteristik der Federlinge“ in Zeitschrift für gesammelte Naturwissenschaften Band 9 1857
 „Beiträge zur Infusorienkunde“ in Neue Schriften der naturforschenden Gesellschaft in Halle Band 3 Heft 1 1817
 „Anatomie der Vögel“ in Meckels deutschen Archiv für Physiologie Band 1 1815 Band 2 1816, Band 3 1817 Band 6 1820 und Band 11 1826
 Osteographischen Beiträge zur Naturgeschichte der Vögel, 1811
 System der Pterylographie, bei Burmeister 1840
 Observationes de Avium arteria carotide communi, (Halle) 1829
 “Charakteristik der Federlinge“ in Zeitschrift für gesammelte Naturwissenschaften Band 9 1857  
 Pterlyographiae Avium pars prior, (Halle) 1833 — Traduit en anglais sous le titre de Nitzsch's Pterylography à la Ray Society en 1867.
 “Zur Geschichte der Thierinsektenkunde“ in der Zeitschrift für gesammelte Naturwissenschaften 5 Band 1855
 “Beiträge zur Infusorienkunde“ in Neue Schriften der naturforschenden Gesellschaft in Halle Band 3 Heft 1 1817
 “Anatomie der Vögel“ in Meckels deutschen Archiv für Physiologie Band 1 1815 Band 2 1816, Band 3 1817 Band 6 1820 und Band 11 1826
 “Osteographischen Beiträge zur Naturgeschichte der Vögel“ 1811

Literature
 Walter Friedensburg „Geschichte der Universität Wittenberg“  Verlag Max Niemeyer Halle (Saale) 1917
 „Album Academicae Vitebergensis“ von (1710-1812) bearbeitet von Fritz Juntke im Max Niemeyer Verlag Halle (Saale) Band 5 1966

References

External links 
 Rolf Gattermann/Volker Neumann: Die Geschichte der Zoologie in Halle PDF

1782 births
1837 deaths
19th-century German zoologists
German ornithologists
German entomologists
Members of the Royal Swedish Academy of Sciences
Academic staff of the Martin Luther University of Halle-Wittenberg